Gnomonia rubi is a fungal plant pathogen that causes cane canker on Rubus.

References

Fungal plant pathogens and diseases
Small fruit diseases
Gnomoniaceae
Fungi described in 1885